"Digital Bath" is a song by the American alternative metal band Deftones from their third album, White Pony. It was released as a promotional single. Belching Beaver released a limited edition beer named after the song in 2018.

Style
"Digital Bath" features a variety of effects and sampling. The verse is composed of echoed guitar chords and soothing, whispered vocals. The song also features a high vocal pitch from Chino Moreno virtually unheard in other Deftones material. Moreno stated that despite the "prettiness" of the song, it's actually about "electrocuting a girl in a bathtub".

Music video
A music video for the song was directed by Andrew Bennett. The video features live footage of the band intercut with segments of a woman entering a bathtub and the band performing at a rehearsal space. "Digital Bath" was performed live on The Tonight Show with Jay Leno on February 9, 2001.

Appearances in other media
 On the 2001 horror movie Soul Survivors, played over the end credits.

 On the compilation album WWF Tough Enough.

Charts

Covers
English mathcore band Rolo Tomassi did a cover version for the Kerrang! compilation album Kerrang! Ultimate Rock Heroes!, released in June 2015.

Brandon Smith of The Anix did a cover for his 7th studio album, Hologram.

References

Deftones songs
2000 songs
2000 singles
Maverick Records singles
Song recordings produced by Terry Date
Songs written by Stephen Carpenter
Songs written by Chi Cheng (musician)
Songs written by Abe Cunningham
Songs written by Chino Moreno